Illinois Route 54 (IL 54) is a  east–west highway in east-central Illinois. It passes through the cities of Clinton, Gibson City, and Onarga. Its western terminus is at Interstate 55 (I-55) in Springfield. Its eastern terminus is at U.S. Route 45 (US 45) at Onarga, one mile (1.6 km) east of I-57.

Route description
IL 54 runs southwest-to-northeast from Springfield. It is now mainly a local road, as I-55 and I-57 have become preferred for long distance travel in the region.

History
Until 1972, IL 54 was signed as US 54. US 54 now terminates between Pittsfield and Griggsville at mile marker 35 on I-72/US 36. The US 54 alignment between this point and IL 54's current western terminus has since been replaced by the combined I-72/US 36 freeway and I-55.

Major intersections

See also

References

External links

State highways in Illinois
U.S. Route 66 in Illinois
U.S. Route 54
Transportation in Sangamon County, Illinois
Transportation in Logan County, Illinois
Transportation in DeWitt County, Illinois
Transportation in McLean County, Illinois
Transportation in Ford County, Illinois
Transportation in Iroquois County, Illinois
Transportation in Champaign County, Illinois